COVID-19 pandemic in Washington may refer to:

 COVID-19 pandemic in Washington (state)
 COVID-19 pandemic in Washington, D.C.